Struck Oil is an 1874 play set during the American Civil War and a 1919 Australian silent film, now considered lost. The play, which introduced Maggie Moore to Australian theatre-goers, was popular with the Australian public and the basis of  J. C. Williamson's success as a theatre entrepreneur. A film based on the play and directed by Franklyn Barrett was produced in 1919.

Plot
John Stofel is a Dutch shoemaker who has settled in America, and has a daughter, Lizzie. During the US Civil War, John goes off to fight, in the place of a cowardly deacon who gives him the title deed of a farm. John returns from the war wounded and insane. Oil is discovered on the farm and the deacon tries to take the land back. However, John regains his memory, finds the hidden title deed and the deacon is forced to give up his claim to the Stofels.

The play

Origins
J. C. Williamson was an American leading actor who had toured Australia and just married Maggie Moore when he read a one-act play called The Dead, or Five Years Away by Irish miner and amateur playwright Sam Smith. It was originally a one-man piece about John Stofel, similar to Rip Van Winkle. Williamson bought the play outright for $100, had it rewritten by his friend Clay M. Greene, and retitled it Struck Oil. He then took the play to Salt Lake City where Williamson claims to have re-written the last act himself.

Popularity
Williamson and Moore appeared in the play when it made its debut on 23 February 1874. It was a hit and they then took it to Australia where it debuted in Melbourne at the Theatre Royal on 1 August 1874.

The play was a great success, ultimately selling 93,000 tickets in a city of 110,000 people, and proved equally popular around the rest of the country. What was meant to be a 12-week tour of Australia ended up lasting for fifteen months and netting Williamson £15,000.

Williamson used this money to launch his career as a theatre manager and Maggie Moore became one of the most popular performers on the Australian stage.

In 1880 L. M. Bayless, a rival theatre manager, mounted a production of Struck Oil at the Academy of Music, Adelaide, but was deterred by Williamson's threat of legal action although he may have been breaking no (South Australian) law.

Williamson and Moore toured with the play in India, the US, Europe and Britain, as well as frequently reviving it in Australia. In 1894 Moore left Williamson and formed her own theatre company; they divorced in 1899.
Williamson tried to stop her from appearing in the play but was unsuccessful and she continued to revive it throughout her career until her death in 1926.

The film
Struck Oil is a 1919 Australian silent film directed by Franklyn Barrett, based on the stage play. It is considered a lost film.

Cast
Maggie Moore as Lizzie Stofel
Harry Roberts as John Stofel
Percy Walshe as Deacon Skinner
Boyd Irwin
David Edelsten

Maggie Moore married Harry Roberts in 1902 and he became her acting and business partner, appearing with her in several productions of Struck Oil. By the time she appeared in the film version of the play she was well into her sixties.

Production
The film was shot in Sydney in August and September 1919. It is likely the budget was low.

Reception
The film was not a success at the box office, which may be explained by the lack of access Humbert Pugliese had to other theatres around Australia.

Variety gave the film a scathing review saying "the redeeming feature is the photography, otherwise the entire film should be scrapped."

References

External links

Struck Oil at National Film and Sound Archive
Copy of film script at National Archives of Australia

1919 films
Australian drama films
Australian black-and-white films
Australian silent feature films
Lost Australian films
1919 drama films
1919 lost films
Lost drama films
Silent drama films
1910s English-language films